The 2013–14 United Counties League season (known as the 2013–14 ChromaSport & Trophies United Counties League for sponsorship reasons) was the 107th in the history of the United Counties League, a football competition in England.

Premier Division

The Premier Division featured 16 clubs which competed in the division last season, along with three new clubs:
AFC Rushden & Diamonds, promoted from Division One
Northampton Sileby Rangers, promoted from Division One
Wisbech Town, transferred from the Eastern Counties League

Originally Woodford United were relegated from the Southern Football League and placed in the Premier Division, however on the eve of their opening day fixture with Sleaford Town the match was called off and they have dropped down to play in Division One for the season.

League table

Results

Division One

Division One featured 16 clubs which competed in the division last season, along with six new clubs:
Blackstones, relegated from the Premier Division
Irchester United, relegated from the Premier Division
Lutterworth Athletic, transferred from the East Midlands Counties League
Peterborough Sports, promoted from the Peterborough and District Football League
St Neots Town Saints, a newly formed club
Woodford United, demoted from the Southern Football League

League table

Results

References

External links
 United Counties League

9
United Counties League seasons